The Korea Open is a professional tennis tennis tournament held in Seoul, South Korea. The women's edition started in 2004 as 
WTA International tournament and was played at the Seoul Olympic Park Tennis Center on outdoor hardcourts. In 2012 and 2013, it was sponsored by KDB (formerly sponsored by Hansol). In 2014, Kia Motors was the sponsor.

In 2020, the tournament was cancelled due to the COVID-19 pandemic. In 2021, it was originally scheduled as a WTA 250 event in September, but was later postponed and rescheduled to December as a WTA 125 tournament and indoor event.

In 2022, the women's edition returned as a WTA 250 tournament and the first edition of men's ATP World Tour 250 event also took place.

Past finals

Men's singles

Women's singles

Men's doubles

Women's doubles

See also
Seoul Open
List of tennis tournaments

 
Tennis tournaments in South Korea
Sport in South Korea
Sport in Seoul
Hard court tennis tournaments
WTA Tour
Recurring sporting events established in 2004